The Kara-Khanid Khanate, also known as the Karakhanids, Qarakhanids, Ilek Khanids or the Afrasiabids, was a Turkic khanate that ruled Central Asia in the 9th through the early 13th century.  The dynastic names of Karakhanids and Ilek Khanids refer to royal titles with Kara Khagan being the most important Turkic title up until the end of the dynasty.

The Khanate conquered Transoxiana in Central Asia and ruled it independently between 999 and 1089. After that, they ruled as vassals of the Seljuqs until the Battle of Qatwan in 1141, and then as vassals of the Qara Khitais until 1211. Their arrival in Transoxiana signaled a definitive shift from Iranian to Turkic predominance in Central Asia, yet the Kara-khanids gradually assimilated the Perso-Arab Muslim culture, while retaining some of their native Turkic culture.

The capitals of the Kara-Khanid Khanate included Kashgar, Balasagun, Uzgen and Samarkand.  In the 1040s, the Khanate split into the Eastern and Western Khanates.  In the late 11th century, they came under the suzerainty of the Seljuk Empire, followed by the Qara Khitai (Western Liao dynasty) in the mid-12th century. The Eastern Khanate ended in 1211, and the Western Khanate was extinguished by the Khwarazmian Empire in 1213.

The history of the Kara-Khanid Khanate is reconstructed from fragmentary and often contradictory written sources, as well as studies on their coinage.

Names
The term Karakhanid was derived from Qara Khan or Qara Khaqan, the foremost title of the rulers of the dynasty. The word "Kara" means "black" and also "courageous" from Old Turkic (𐰴𐰺𐰀) and khan means ruler.  The term was devised by European Orientalists in the 19th century to describe both the dynasty and the Turks ruled by it.  
 Arabic Muslim sources called this dynasty al-Khaqaniya ("That of the Khaqans") or al Muluk al-Khaniyya al-Atrak (The Khanal kings of the Turks).
 In his linguistic treatise Dīwān Lughāt al-Turk, Mahmud al-Kashgari, a native-born Karakhanid, listed two endonyms: "Khāqānī Turks" or just "Turks", the latter he also used to denote Turkic peoples in general. 
 Persian sources often used the term Al-i Afrasiyab  based on a supposed link to the legendary though actually unrelated King Afrasiab of pre-Islamic Transoxania. Kashgari refers to him as Alp Er Tunga.
 They are also referred to as Ilek Khanids or Ilak Khanids in Persian.
 Chinese sources refer to this dynasty as Kalahan  or Heihan  (literally "Black Khan") or Dashi (a term for Arabs that extends to Muslims in general).

History

Origin

The Kara-Khanid Khanate originated from a confederation formed some time in the 9th century by Karluks, Yagmas, Chigils, Tuhsi, and other peoples living in Zhetysu, Western Tian Shan (modern Kyrgyzstan), and Western Xinjiang around Kashgar. 10th-century Arab historian Al-Masudi listed two "Khagan of Khagans" of the Karluk horde: Sanah, a possible rendition of Ashina (compare Śaya (also by al-Masudi), Aś(i)nas (al-Tabari), Ānsa (Hudud al-'Alam), and Śaba (Ibn Khordadbeh)), and Afrasiab, whom 11th-century Karakhanid scholar Mahmud al-Kashgari identified with Turkic king Alp Er Tunga, the legendary progenitor of the Karakhanid ruling dynasty. Furthermore, Kara-khanid heads of state claimed the title khagan, which indicates that they may have been descended from the Ashina. Even so, the tribal origin of Bilge Kul Qadir Khan, the first Kara-Khan, is still unknown: if Bilge Kul Qadir descended from the Karluk Yabghus, then he indeed belonged to the Ashina dynasty as they did; if Bilge Kul Qadir descended from the Yagma (as suggested by Vasily Bartold), then he did not, considering that the Hudud al-'Alam stated that "Their [Yagmas'] king is from the family of the Toġuzġuz kings", that Ashina tribe was not listed among the Toquz Oghuz (Ch. 九姓 Jĭu Xìng "Nine Surnames") in Chinese-language sources and that early Uyghur khagans belonged to the Yaglakar clan of Toquz Oghuz and later Uyghur khagans belonged to the Ädiz clan. Alternatively, Bilge Kul Qadir might belong to the Eðgiş or Chigils.

Early history

The Karluks were a nomadic people from the western Altai Mountains who moved to Zhetysu. In 742, the Karluks were part of an alliance led by the Basmyl and Uyghurs that rebelled against the Göktürks. In the realignment of power that followed, the Karluks were elevated from a tribe led by an Elteber to one led by a yabghu, which was one of the highest Turkic dignitaries and also implies membership in the Ashina clan in whom the "heaven-mandated" right to rule resided.  The Karluks and Uyghurs later allied themselves against the Basmyl, and within two years they toppled the Basmyl khagan. The Uyghur yabghu became khagan and the Karluk leader yabghu. This arrangement lasted less than a year.  Hostilities between the Uyghur and Karluk forced the Karluk to migrate westward into the western Turgesh lands.

By 766 the Karluks had forced the submission of the Turgesh and they established their capital at Suyab on the Chu River. The Karluk confederation by now included the Chigil and Tukshi tribes who may have been Türgesh tribes incorporated into the Karluk union. By the mid-9th century, the Karluk confederation had gained control of the sacred lands of the Western Türks after the destruction of the Uyghur Khaganate by the Old Kirghiz. Control of sacred lands, together with their affiliation with the Ashina clan, allowed the Khaganate to be passed on to the Karluks along with domination of the steppes after the previous Khagan was killed in a revolt.

During the 9th century southern Central Asia was under the rule of the Samanids, while the Central Asian steppe was dominated by Turkic nomads such as the Pechenegs, the Oghuz Turks, and the Karluks. The domain of the Karluks reached as far north as the Irtysh and the Kimek confederation, with encampments extending to the Chi and Ili rivers, where the Chigil and Tukshi tribes lived, and east to the Ferghana valley and beyond. The area to the south and east of the Karluks was inhabited by the Yagma. The Karluk center in the 9th and 10th centuries appears to have been at Balasagun on the Chu River. In the late 9th century the Samanids marched into the steppes and captured Taraz, one of the headquarters of the Karluk khagan, and a large church was transformed into a mosque.

Formation of the Kara-Khanid Khanate 

During the 9th century, the Karluk confederation (including three chief tribes: the Bulaq (Mouluo 謀落 / Moula 謀剌), Taşlïk (Tashili 踏實力), and Sebek (Suofu 娑匐), along with Chigils, Charuks, Barskhans, Khalajes, Azkishi and Tuhsis (the last three being possibly remnants of Türgesh<ref>Gumilyov, L. Searches for an Imaginary Kingdom: The trefoil of the Bird's Eye View' Ch. 5: The Shattered Silence (961–1100)</ref>Minorsky, V. "Commentary" on "§17. The Tukhs" in Ḥudūd al'Ālam. Translated and Explained by V. Minorsky. pp. 300–304.) and the Yaghma, possible descendants of the Toquz Oghuz, joined forces and formed the first Karluk-Karakhanid khaganate. The Chigils appear to have formed the nucleus of the Karakhanid army. The date of its foundation and the name of its first khan is uncertain, but according to one reconstruction, the first Karakhanid ruler was Bilge Kul Qadir Khan. 

The rulers of the Karakhanids were likely to be from the Chigil and Yaghma tribes – the Eastern Khagan bore the title Arslan Qara Khaqan (Arslan "lion" was the totem of the Chigil) and the Western Khagan the title Bughra Qara Khaqan (Bughra "male camel" was the totem of the Yaghma). The names of animals were a regular element in the Turkic titles of the Karakhanids: thus Aslan (lion), Bughra (camel), Toghan (falcon), Böri (wolf), and Toghrul or Toghrïl (a bird of prey).  Under the Khagans were four rulers with the titles Arslan Ilig, Bughra Ilig, Arslan Tegin and Bughra Tegin. The titles of the members of the
dynasty changed with their position, normally upwards, in the dynastic hierarchy.

In the mid-10th century the Kara-Khanids converted to Islam and adopted Muslim names and honorifics, but retained Turkic regnal titles such as Khan, Khagan, Ilek (Ilig) and Tegin. Later they adopted the Arab titles sultan and sultān al-salātīn (sultan of sultans). According to the Ottoman historian known as Munajjim-bashi, a Karakhanid prince named Sultan Satuq Bughra Khan was the first of the khans to convert. After conversion, he obtained a fatwa which permitted him in effect to kill his presumably-still-pagan father, after which he conquered Kashgar (of the old Shule Kingdom). Later, in 960, according to Muslim historians Ibn Miskawaih and Ibn al-Athir, there was a mass conversion of the Turks (reportedly "200,000 tents of the Turks"), and circumstantial evidence suggests these were the Karakhanids.

Conquest of Transoxiana

The grandson of Satuk Bughra Khan, Hasan b. Sulayman (or Harun) (title: Bughra Khan) attacked the Samanids in the late 10th century. Between 990 and 992, Hasan took Isfijab, Ferghana, Ilaq, Samarkand, and the Samanid capital Bukhara. However, Hasan Bughra Khan died in 992 due to an illness, and the Samanids returned to Bukhara.

Hasan's cousin Ali b. Musa (title: Kara Khan or Arslan Khan) resumed the campaign against the Samanids, and by 999 Ali's son Nasr had taken Chach, Samarkand, and Bukhara. The Samanid domains were divided between the Ghaznavids, who gained Khorasan and Afghanistan, and the Karakhanids, who received Transoxiana. The Oxus River thus became the boundary between the two rival empires.

The Karakhanid state was divided into appanages (Ülüş system), as was common of Turkic and Mongol nomads. The Karakhanid appanages were associated with four principal urban centers, Balasagun (then the capital of the Karakhanid state) in Zhetysu, Kashgar in Xinjiang, Uzgen in Fergana, and Samarkand in Transoxiana. The dynasty's original domains of Zhetysu and Kasgar and their khans retained an implicit seniority over those who ruled in Transoxiana and Fergana. The four sons of Ali (Ahmad, Nasr, Mansur, Muhammad) each held their own independent appanage within the Karakhanid state.  Nasr, the conqueror of Transoxiana, held the large central area of Transoxiana (Samarkand and Bukhara), Fergana (Uzgen) and other areas, although after his death his appanage was further divided.  Ahmad held Zhetysu and Chach and became the head of the dynasty after the death of Ali. The brothers Ahmad and Nasr conducted different policies towards the Ghaznavids in the south – while Ahmad tried to form an alliance with Mahmud of Ghazna, Nasr attempted to expand unsuccessfully into Ghaznavid territory.

Ahmad was succeeded by Mansur, and after the death of Mansur, the Hasan Bughra Khan branch of the Karakhanids became dominant.  Hasan's sons Muhammad Toghan Khan II, and Yusuf Kadir Khan who held Kashgar, became in turn the head of the Karakhanid dynasty. The two families, i.e., the descendants of Ali Arslan Khan and Hasan Bughra Khan, would eventually split the Karakhanid Khanate in two.

In 1017–1018, the Karakhanids repelled an attack by a large mass of nomadic Turkic tribes in what was described in Muslim sources as a great victory. Around the same time, the Kara-Khanid ruler Ilig Khan reached an agreement with Mahmud of Ghazni, in which they agreed to partition former Samanid territory along the Oxus river.

Conquest of western Tarim Basin
The Islamic conquest of the Buddhist cities east of Kashgar began when the Karakhanid Sultan Satuq Bughra Khan converted to Islam in 934 and then captured Kashgar. He and his son directed endeavors to proselytize Islam among the Turks and engage in military conquests. In the mid-10th century, Satuq's son Musa began to put pressure on Khotan, and a long period of war between Kashgar and the Kingdom of Khotan ensued. Satok Bughra Khan's nephew or grandson Ali Arslan was said to have been killed by Buddhists during the war; during the reign of Ahmad b. Ali, the Karakhanids also engaged in wars against non-Muslims to the east and northeast.

Muslim accounts tell the tale of the four imams from Mada'in city (possibly now in Iraq) who travelled to help Yusuf Qadir Khan, the Qarakhanid leader, in his conquest of Khotan, Yarkend, and Kashgar. The "infidels" were said to have been driven towards Khotan, but the four Imams were killed. In 1006, Yusuf Qadir Khan of Kashgar conquered the Kingdom of Khotan, ending Khotan's existence as an independent state.

The conquest of the western Tarim Basin which includes Khotan and Kashgar is significant in the eventual Turkification and Islamification of the Tarim Basin, and modern Uyghurs identify with the Karakhanids even though the name Uyghur was taken from the Manichaean Uyghur Khaganate and the Buddhist state of Qocho.

Division of the Kara-Khanid Khanate

Early in the 11th century the unity of the Karakhanid dynasty was fractured by frequent internal warfare that eventually resulted in the formation of two independent Karakhanid states. A son of Hasan Bughra Khan, Ali Tegin, seized control of Bukhara and other towns. He expanded his territory further after the death of Mansur. The son of Nasr, Böritigin, later waged war against the sons of Ali Tegin, and won control of a large part of Transoxiana, making Samarkand the capital. In 1041, another son of Nasr b. Ali, Muhammad 'Ayn ad-Dawlah (reigned 1041–52) took over the administration of the western branch of the family that eventually led to a formal separation of the Khara-Khanid Khanate. Ibrahim Tamghach Khan was considered by Muslim historians as a great ruler, and he brought some stability to the Western Karakhanids by limiting the appanage system that caused much of the internal strife in the Kara-Khanid Khanate.

The Hasan family remained in control of the Eastern Khanate. The Eastern Khanate had its capital at Balasaghun and later Kashgar. The Fergana-Zhetysu areas became the border between the two states and were frequently contested. When the two states were formed, Fergana fell into realm of the Eastern Khanate, but was later captured by Ibrahim and became part of the Western Khanate.

Seljuk suzerainty

In 1040, the Seljuk Empire defeated the Ghaznavids at the Battle of Dandanaqan and entered Iran. Conflict with the Karakhanids broke out, but the Karakhanids were able to withstand attacks by the Seljuks initially, even briefly taking control of Seljuk towns in Greater Khorasan. The Karakhanids, however, developed serious conflicts with the religious classes (the ulama), and the ulama of Transoxiana then requested the intervention of the Seljuks. In 1089, during the reign of Ibrahim's grandson Ahmad b. Khidr, the Seljuks entered and took control of Samarkand, together with the domains belonging to the Western Khanate.  For half a century, the Western Karakhanid Khanate was a vassal of the Seljuks, who largely controlled the appointment of the Khanate's rulers in that time. Ahmad b. Khidr was returned to power by the Seljuks, but in 1095, the ulama accused Ahmad of heresy and managed to secure his execution.

The Karakhanids of Kashgar also declared their submission following a Seljuk campaign into Talas and Zhetysu, but the Eastern Khanate was a Seljuk vassal for only a short time. At the beginning of the 12th century the Eastern Khanate invaded Transoxiana and briefly occupied the Seljuk town of Termez.

 Qara Khitai invasion 
The Qara Khitai (Western Liao dynasty) host which invaded Central Asia was composed of remnants from the defunct Liao dynasty which was annihilated by the Jin dynasty in 1125. The Liao noble Yelü Dashi recruited warriors from various tribes and formed a horde that moved westward to rebuild the Liao dynasty. Yelü occupied Balasagun on the Chu River, then defeated the Western Karakhanids in Khujand in 1137. In 1141 Qara Khitai became the dominant force in the region after they dealt a devastating blow to the Seljuk Sultan Ahmad Sanjar and the Kara-Khanids at the Battle of Qatwan near Samarkand. Several military commanders of Karakhanid lineages such as the father of Osman of Khwarazm fled from Karakhanid lands in the wake of the Qara Khitai invasion.

Despite losing to the Qara Khitai, the Karakhanid dynasty remained in power as their vassals. The Qara Khitai themselves stayed at Zhetysu near Balasagun, and allowed some of the Karakhanids to continue to rule as their tax collectors in Samarkand and Kashgar. Under the Qara Khitai the Karakhanids functioned as administrators for sedentary Muslim populations. While the Qara Khitai were Buddhists ruling over a largely Muslim population, they were considered fair-minded rulers whose reign was marked by religious tolerance. Islamic religious life continued uninterrupted and Islamic authority persevered under the Qara Khitai. Kashgar became a Nestorian metropolitan see and Christian gravestones in the Chu River Valley appeared beginning in this period. However, Kuchlug, a Naiman who usurped the throne of the Qara Khitai dynasty, instituted anti-Islamic policies on the local populations under his rule.

 Downfall 
The decline of the Seljuks following their defeat by the Qara Khitais at the Battle of Qatwan (1141) allowed the Khwarazmian dynasty, then a vassal of the Qara Khitai, to expand into former Seljuk territory, where they became independent rulers circa 1190. In 1207, the citizens of Bukhara revolted against the sadrs (leaders of the religious classes), which the Khwarazmshah 'Ala' ad-Din Muhammad used as a pretext to conquer Bukhara. Muhammad then formed an alliance with the Western Karakhanid ruler Uthman ibn Ibrahim (who later married Muhammad's daughter) against the Qara Khitai. In 1210, the Khwarezm-Shah took Samarkand after the Qara Khitai retreated to deal with the rebellion from the Naiman Kuchlug, who had seized the Qara Khitans' treasury at Uzgen. The Khwarezm-Shah then defeated the Qara Khitai near Talas. Muhammad and Kuchlug had, apparently, agreed to divide up the Qara Khitan's empire. In 1212, the population of Samarkand staged a revolt against the Khwarezmians, a revolt which Uthman supported, and massacred them. The Khwarezm-Shah returned, recaptured Samarkand and executed Uthman. He demanded the submission of all leading Karakhanids, and finally extinguished the Western Karakhanid state.

In 1204, a rebellion of the Eastern Kara-Khanid in Kashgar was suppressed by the Kara-Khitai who took the prince Yusuf hostage to Balasagun.   The prince was later released but he was killed in Kashgar by rebels in 1211, effectively ending the Eastern Kara-Khanid.  In 1214, the rebels in Kashgar surrendered to Kuchlug, who had usurped the Kara-Khitai throne.  In 1218, Kuchlug was killed by the Mongol army.  Some of the Kara-Khitai's eastern vassals including Eastern Kara-Khanids then joined the Mongol forces to conquer the Khwarezmian Empire.

 Culture 

The takeover by the Karakhanids did not change the essentially Iranian character of Central Asia, though it set into motion a demographic and ethnolinguistic shift. During the Karakhanid era, the local population began using Turkic in speech – initially the shift was linguistic with the local people adopting the Turkic language. While Central Asia became Turkicized over the centuries, culturally the Turks came close to being Persianized or, in certain respects, Arabicized. Nevertheless, the official or court language used in Kashgar and other Karakhanid centers, referred to as "Khaqani" (royal), remained Turkic.  The language was partly based on dialects spoken by the Turkic tribes that made up the Karakhanids and possessed qualities of linear descent from Kök and Karluk Turkic. The Turkic script was also used for all documents and correspondence of the khaqans, according to Dīwānu l-Luġat al-Turk.

The Dīwānu l-Luġat al-Turk (Dictionary of Languages of the Turks) was written by a prominent Karakhanid historian, Mahmud al-Kashgari, who may have lived for some time in Kashgar at the Karakhanid court. He wrote this first comprehensive dictionary of Turkic languages in Arabic for the Caliphs of Baghdad in 1072–76. Another famous Karakhanid writer was Yusuf Balasaghuni, who wrote Kutadgu Bilig (The Wisdom of Felicity), the only known literary work written in Turkic from the Karakhanid period. Kutadgu Bilig is a form of advice literature known as mirrors for princes. The Turkic identity is evident in both of these pieces of work, but they also showed the influences of Persian and Islamic culture. However, the court culture of the Karakhanids remained almost entirely Persian. The two last western khaqans also wrote poetry in Persian.The Cambridge World History describes the Kara-Khanid state as the first of the Islamic Turco-Iranian states.

Islam and its civilization flourished under the Karakhanids.  The earliest example of madrasas in Central Asia was founded in Samarkand by Ibrahim Tamghach Khan. Ibrahim also founded a hospital to care for the sick as well as providing shelter for the poor. His son Shams al-Mulk Nasr built ribats for the caravanserais on the route between Bukhara and Samarkand, as well as a palace near Bukhara. Some of the buildings constructed by the Karakhanids still survive today, including the Kalyan minaret built by Mohammad Arslan Khan beside the main mosque in Bukhara, and three mausolea in Uzgend. The early Karakhanid rulers, as nomads, lived not in the city but in an army encampment outside the capital, and while by the time of Ibrahim the Karakhanids still maintained a nomadic tradition, their extensive religious and civil constructions showed that they had assimilated the culture and traditions of the settled population of Transoxiana. During the excavations of the citadel of Samarkand, the ruins of the palace of the Karakhanid ruler Ibrahim ibn Hussein (1178-1202) were found. The palace was decorated with wall paintings.Karev, Yury (2003) “Un cycle de peintures murales d’époque qarākhānide (XIIème-XIIIème siècles) à la citadelle de Samarkand: le souverain et le peintre”, Comptes Rendus de l’Académie des Inscriptions et Belles-Lettres, fasc. 4: 301-47.

Numerous works of art and decorative objects are also known from the realm of the Kara-Khanids during the time of their rule (840–1212). Samarkand, with its old citadel of Afrasiab where many works of art have been excavated, was conquered by the Kara-Khanids between 990 and 992, and held until 1212 (11th-12th centuries):

 Legacy 
Kara-Khanid is arguably the most enduring cultural heritage among coexisting cultures in Central Asia from the 9th to the 13th centuries. The Karluk-Uyghur dialect spoken by the nomadic tribes and Turkified sedentary populations under Kara-Khanid rule formed two major branches of the Turkic language family, the Chagatay and the Kypchak. The Kara-Khanid cultural model that combined nomadic Turkic culture with Islamic, sedentary institutions spread east into former Kara-Khoja and Tangut territories and west and south into the subcontinent, Khorasan (Turkmenistan, Afghanistan, and Northern Iran), Golden Horde territories (Tataristan), and Turkey. The Chagatay, Timurid, and Uzbek states and societies inherited most of the cultures of the Kara-Khanids and the Khwarezmians without much interruption.

The Kara-Khanids translated the Quran into Middle Turkic. There are four surviving copies of the Quran translations found in various collections and a Middle Turkic excerpt of Al-Fatiha, which supposedly belong to the Kara-Khanid period.

Identification with China
Kara-Khanid monarchs adopted Temahaj Khan (Turkic for "Khan of China") or Malik al-Mashriq wa-l’Sin (Arabic for "King of the East and China") as their title, and minted coins bearing these titles. Another title they used was Sulṭān al-Sharq wa al-Ṣīn (Sultan of the East and China). Early period "proto-Qarakhanid" coinage featured Chinese-style square-holed coins, combined with Arabic writing.

Much of the realm of the Kara-Khanid Khanate, including Transoxiana and the western Tarim Basin, had been under the rule of the Tang dynasty prior to the Battle of Talas in 751, and the Kara-Khanid rulers continued to identify their dynasty with China several centuries later. Yusuf Qadir Khan sent the first Kara-Khanid envoy to the Song dynasty, Boyla Saghun, to request the Song to send an official envoy who would help 'pacify' Khotan, apparently seeking to use the prestige of the Chinese court to strengthen the Kara-Khanids' local status.

The Kara-Khanid rulers also formed marriage relations with the Liao dynasty and addressed the Song emperors as "maternal uncle", in possible imitation of Uyghur and Tibetan rulers who had marital relations with the previous Tang dynasty.

In an account, the Kara-Khanid scholar Mahmud al-Kashgari referred to his homeland, around Kashgar, then part of the Kara-Khanid Khanate, as "Lower China".

Genetics

A genetic study published in Nature'' in May 2018 examined the remains of three Khara-Khanid individuals. They were found to be carrying the maternal haplogroups G2a2, A and J1c. The Kara-Khanid were found to have more East Asian ancestry than the preceding Goktürks.

Monarchs

Bilge Kul Qadir Khan (840–893)
Bazir Arslan Khan (893–920)
Oghulcak Khan (893–940)
Satuk Bughra Khan 920–955, in 932 adopted Islam, in 940 took power over Karluks
Musa Bughra Khan 955–958
Suleyman Arslan Khan 958–970
Ali Arslan Khan 970–998, Great Qaghan  
Ahmad Arslan Qara Khan 998–1017, son of Ali Arslan
Mansur Arslan Khan 1017–1024, son of Ali Arslan
Muhammad Toghan Khan 1024–1026, son of Hasan b. Sulayman
Yusuf Qadir Khan 1026–1032, son of Hasan b. Sulayman
Ali Tigin Bughra Khan (1020–1034), Great Qaghan in Samarkand, son of Hasan b. Sulayman
Ebu Shuca Sulayman 1034–1042

Western Karakhanids

Tamghach Khan Ibrahim (also known as Böritigin) c. 1040–1068
Shams al-Mulk Nasr  1068–1080: married Aisha, daughter of Alp Arslan.
Khidr 1080–1081
Ahmad 1081–1089
Ya'qub Qadir Khan 1089–1095
Mas'ud 1095–1097
Sulayman Qadir Tamghach 1097
Mahmud Arslan Khan 1097–1099
Jibrail Arslan Khan 1099–1102
Muhammad Arslan Khan 1102–1129
Nasr 1129
Ahmad Qadir Khan 1129–1130
Hasan Jalal ad-Dunya 1130–1132
Ibrahim Rukn ad-Dunya 1132
Mahmud 1132–1141 
Ibrahim Tabghach Khan 1141–1156
Ali Chaghri Khan 1156–1161
Mas'ud Tabghach Khan 1161–1171
Muhammad Tabghach Khan 1171–1178
Ibrahim Arslan Khan 1178–1202
Uthman ibn Ibrahim 1202–1212

Eastern Karakhanids

Ebu Shuca Sulayman 1042–1056
Muhammad bin Yusuph 1056–1057
İbrahim bin Muhammad Khan 1057–1059
Mahmud 1059–1075
Umar (Kara-Khanid) 1075
Ebu Ali el-Hasan 1075–1102
Ahmad Khan 1102–1128
İbrahim bin Ahmad 1128–1158
Muhammad bin İbrahim 1158–?
Yusuph bin Muhammad ?–1205
Ebul Feth Muhammad 1205–1211

See also
Khanate
Göktürks
Uyghur Khaganate
Uyghur people
Karluks
Chigils
Yaghmas
List of Sunni Muslim dynasties
History of the central steppe
Islamization and Turkification of Xinjiang

Notes

References

Citations

Sources 

 .
 

 (alk. paper)

  (paperback).
 

 Kochnev, Boris D. (1996) “The Origins of the Karakhanids. A Reconsideration”, Der Islam, 73: 352-7. 
 

 

 
 

 

 Fedorov M.N. Karakhanidskaya numizmatika kak istochnik po istorii Sredney Azii kontsa X — nachala XIII vv. Avtoreferat doktorskoy dissertatsii. Novosibirsk. 1990
 
 
  
 

Ashina tribe
1212 disestablishments in Asia
840 establishments
Former countries in Central Asia
Former countries in Chinese history
Khanates
Former confederations